Ruth Macklin is an American philosopher and retired professor of bioethics.

Education 
Ruth Macklin studied philosophy at Cornell University then received Ph.D. in philosophy from Case Western Reserve University.

Career 
She is distinguished university professor emerita at Albert Einstein College of Medicine in New York City. She has more than 280 scholarly publications and books on HIV/AIDS, the ethics of human reproduction, the ethics of human subjects in research, health policy, public health ethics, and more. She has been adviser to the World Health Organization, chairperson of a committee at UNAIDS and at the Centers for Disease Control and Prevention, a member of several ethical review committees, an elected member of the National Academy of Medicine, co-chair of the National Advisory Board on Ethics in Reproduction, is a member of  the American Society for Bioethics and Humanities, served as president of the International Association of Bioethics, is a member of the Scientific Advisory Board of PEPFAR, and was a vice president and member of executive committee, Council for International Organizations of Medical Sciences (CIOMS), Geneva. Macklin is a fellow of the Hastings Center, an independent bioethics research institution.

Selected bibliography

Books

Journal articles

See also
 American philosophy
 List of American philosophers

References

21st-century American philosophers
Bioethicists
Case Western Reserve University alumni
Cornell University alumni
Hastings Center Fellows
Living people
Albert Einstein College of Medicine faculty
1938 births
Members of the National Academy of Medicine